Jonas Elofsson (born January 31, 1979) is a Swedish former professional ice hockey player. He last played for Sparta Warriors. He has won two Swedish Championship with Färjestads BK in 1997  and 1998 . He was drafted by the Edmonton Oilers in the 1997 NHL Entry Draft, as the 94th pick overall but never signed a contract.

Career statistics

References

1979 births
Living people
Swedish ice hockey defencemen
Swedish expatriate ice hockey players in Norway
AaB Ishockey players
Dragons de Rouen players
Edmonton Oilers draft picks
Färjestad BK players
HC TPS players
HV71 players
Leksands IF players
Sparta Warriors players